The 1995 Armenian Premier League season was a transitional season, therefore, there was no winner for the competition.

Aragats FC from Gyumri were promoted.
Homenmen-FIMA Yerevan were renamed Homenmen Yerevan.

Group 1

League table

Results

Group 2

League table

Results

Top goalscorers

See also
 1995 in Armenian football
 1995 Armenian First League
 1995 Armenian Cup

Armenian Premier League seasons
1
Armenia
Armenia